Andrew Thomas Lee (born 24 May 1981), known professionally as Andy Lee, is an Australian comedian, television presenter, musician and children's writer. He is known for working alongside Hamish Blake as part of the comedy duo Hamish & Andy.

Personal life
Andy Lee is the middle child of Michael and Margaret Lee. Lee has a younger sister, Alex Miles, who writes pantomimes and stars in the comedy stage show Porky Pies. He also has an older brother, Cameron, with whom Lee started the band Zoophyte.

Lee attended Balwyn Primary School and Camberwell Grammar School. He was also a member of the Scouting Movement, performing in Camberwell Showtime and Melbourne Gang Show. He then went on to study Commerce at the University of Melbourne, where he met comedic partner Hamish Blake in 2001.

In 2006, Lee was announced as Cleo's Bachelor of the Year.

Lee previously dated Megan Gale. They ended their relationship in 2010.

In January 2015, it was announced that Lee was dating model Rebecca Harding. The pair briefly separated in July 2016. The couple reconciled a few months later, and are rumoured to be engaged as of 2021.

Lee is a supporter of the Carlton Football Club and has worked for the club in off-field roles with Carlton members.

Career

Hamish & Andy

Lee and Blake teamed with Ryan Shelton and several others to create a show called Radio Karate for RMIT University's student television company RMITV, broadcast on community-access television station Channel 31. They also trained with, and appeared on, RMIT's student radio station SYN, and they subsequently had a few spot projects on FOX FM.

Lee and Blake then hosted a televised comedy programme on Australia's Seven Network, The Hamish and Andy Show, which was shortly cancelled after bad ratings. Critics acknowledged their talent but panned the show as poorly executed. Since this show, Lee and Blake have almost always performed together. They are now consistently referred to as Hamish & Andy. Another early TV project the duo took part in creating was the mockumentary TV show Real Stories (not to be confused with True Story, a later series by the pair).

Blake and Lee hosted the national (Hit Network) drive-time radio program Hamish & Andy that ran between 4 pm and 6 pm, Monday to Friday. In 2011, the program was cut back to a weekly Friday show due to the duo wanting to pursue other opportunities. The radio show was considered to be immensely successful, scoring top positions in the radio ratings in the crucial Sydney and Melbourne markets (as well as Perth). Their audience share was around 20%, which is the highest ever recorded for a national FM show in Australia.

Lee won the first series of Joker Poker, a celebrity poker show in which contestants win money for charity. He appeared on the Network Ten program Australia's Brainiest Comedian.

He was selected as one of the entrants to the Who's Who in Australia 2011 edition.

On 10 May 2010, Andy and Hamish appeared on the TV show Good News Week.

In 2011, the duo made a deal with Channel Nine, creating a ten-part series called Gap Year: New York. In 2012, the comedy duo created a second Gap Year season, titled Hamish and Andy's: Euro Gap Year, in which the two travelled throughout Europe leading up to the 2012 London Olympic Games. In 2013, they continued the Gap Year series, creating a third season titled Hamish & Andy's Gap Year Asia. In 2014, they completed their fourth and final gap year in South America, aptly titled Hamish & Andy's Gap Year South America. Other projects the pair have worked on include a weekly podcast (as opposed to when they worked on the radio) on the PodcastOne network as well as the aforementioned TV series True Story.

Solo work
Lee released an educational times table CD in 2003, The Sing Along Times Table CD Book. The CD was re-discovered in 2005/2006 after an "alert listener" informed Blake, causing him to tease Lee about it on their radio show.

Lee was a founding member of Melbourne band Zoophyte, along with his brother Cameron. In 2007, Lee had retired from the band due to other commitments, but he occasionally appeared as a guest at gigs.

In 2015, Lee formed Coolboys and the Frontman with comedic partner Hamish Blake and producer Jack Post.

In 2016, Lee surprised his nephew George for his first birthday by authoring what was supposed to be a one-off single-copy children's book called Do Not Open This Book, featuring illustrations by Heath McKenzie. However, the book became very successful, leading to widespread publication and an award-winning series over the next several years. As of 2021, there are 30 items in the Do Not series, including several books.

Ahead of the 2020 AFL season, Seven Network's The Front Bar announced that Lee would join original hosts Andy Maher, Mick Molloy and Sam Pang as a regular cast member.

In early 2021, he was the host and executive producer of the Australian version of the game show The Cube on Network 10. He also hosted The Hundred with Andy Lee on the Nine Network in 2021.

During the 2021–22 Ashes series, Lee served as a commentator on Triple M's coverage.

Awards and nominations

References

External links

Zoophyte

Living people
Australian radio personalities
Hamish & Andy
Comedians from Melbourne
People educated at Camberwell Grammar School
Australian podcasters
Australian game show hosts
1981 births
Australian male comedians
RMITV alumni